Culleen More is a townland in County Westmeath, Ireland.

Culleen More is one of 64 townlands of the civil parish of Mullingar in the barony of Moyashel and Magheradernon in the Province of Leinster. 

The western boundary of the townland is formed by the shoreline of Lough Owel. The N4, a national primary road connecting Dublin with the north–west of Ireland and the coastal town of Sligo, passes to the east of Lough Owel and traverses the townland from southeast to northwest. The Dublin–Sligo railway line of the national rail company Iarnród Éireann, carrying the Dublin to Longford commuter service and the Dublin to Sligo intercity service, also passes through the townland.

The neighbouring townlands are: Portnashangan and Ballynagall to the north, Brockagh to the north–east, Culleen Beg to the south–east, Robinstown (Levinge), Ballyglass and Irishtown to the south and Farranistick to the south–west.

In the 1911 census of Ireland there were 32 houses and 159 inhabitants in the townland.

References

External links
Map of Culleen More townland at openstreetmap.org
Culleen More at the IreAtlas Townland Data Base
Culleen More at Townlands.ie
Culleen More at the Placenames Database of Ireland Department of Arts, Heritage and the Gaeltacht

Townlands of County Westmeath